Josef Kalaš is a Czechoslovak rower. He competed at the 1948 Summer Olympics in London with the men's coxless four where they were eliminated in the round one repechage.

References

External links
 

Year of birth missing
Possibly living people 
Czechoslovak male rowers
Olympic rowers of Czechoslovakia
Rowers at the 1948 Summer Olympics
European Rowing Championships medalists